The 2004–05 season was AS Monaco FC's 48th season in Ligue 1. They again finished third in Ligue 1, whilst getting knocked out of the Coupe de la Ligue and Coupe de France at the Semifinal stage by Caen and Sedan respectively.

Squad

Out on loan

Transfers

In:

Out:

Competitions

Ligue 1

League table

Results summary

Results by round

Results

Coupe de la Ligue

Coupe de France

UEFA Champions League

Group stage

Knockout stage

Round of 16

Statistics

Appearances and Goals

|-
|colspan="14"|Players away from the club on loan:
|-
|colspan="14"|Players who appeared for Monaco no longer at the club:
|}

Goal scorers

Disciplinary record

References

Monaco
AS Monaco FC seasons
AS Monaco
AS Monaco